Fang Bo (born November 6, 1992) is a Chinese male table tennis player. In 2002, Fang Bo became a member of the Shandong Luneng table tennis club. In 2009, he joined the China national table tennis first team. In the same year December 2009, he won all four team and individual titles at the 2009 World Junior Championships, becoming the first youth player to accomplish this feat in China. At his peak in 2015, he reached the men's singles final at the World Championships by defeating the second-seeded Xu Xin and the defending champion Zhang Jike. Fang Bo then obtained his first world table tennis champion title in 2016 during the World Team Table Tennis Championships. In 2017, he partnered with Petrissa Solja of the German table tennis team and won bronze in the mixed doubles at the World Championships in Düsseldorf, Germany. Fang Bo was ranked fifth in the China National Table Tennis (First) Team after emerging as first runner-up of the 2018 China National Table Tennis Championships. In 2019, Fang Bo successfully led his teammates and Team Tian Jin to win the overall team gold medal in the 2019 China Super League. Concomitantly, Fang Bo represented UMMC at the ETTU Table Tennis Champions League and the team came in second after losing 2:3 to Fakel Gazprom Orenburg in the final leg.

Fang Bo announced retirement from Chinese national team in 2021.

References

External links

1992 births
Living people
Chinese male table tennis players
Universiade medalists in table tennis
People from Tongcheng County
Table tennis players from Hubei
World Table Tennis Championships medalists
Universiade gold medalists for China
Universiade bronze medalists for China
Medalists at the 2011 Summer Universiade
Medalists at the 2013 Summer Universiade